Tommaso Menoncello (born 20 August 2002) is an Italian professional rugby union player who primarily plays centre for Benetton of the United Rugby Championship.

Professional career 
Menoncello has previously played for clubs such as Paese in the past. For 2020–21 Pro14 and initially for 2021–22 United Rugby Championship seasons, he was named as Permit Player for Benetton Rugby. 

Selected with F.I.R. Academy, in June 2021 Menoncello was named in Italy Under 20 squad for 2021 Six Nations Under 20s Championship'On the 14 October 2021, he was selected by Alessandro Troncon to be part of an Italy A 28-man squad for the 2021 end-of-year rugby union internationals.

On the 13 January 2022, Menoncello was selected by Kieran Crowley to be part of an Italy 33-man squad for the 2022 Six Nations Championship. He made his debut against France, where he scored a try and became the youngest try-scorer in the history of the tournament, at the age of 19 years and 170 days. 

 Statistics 
 List of international test tries As of 13 November 2022''

References

External links 

2002 births
Living people
Sportspeople from Treviso
Italian rugby union players
Rugby union centres
Rugby union wings
Benetton Rugby players
Italy international rugby union players